Binakael (binakel, binakol, binakul) (transliterated, "to do a sphere") is a type of weaving pattern traditional in the Philippines. Patterns consisting entirely of straight lines are woven so as to create the illusion of curves and volumes. A sense of motion is also sought. Designs are geometric, but often representational. The techniques create illusionistic designs similar to op art patterns and were popular by the late 19th century, when the United States colonized the Philippines and American museums collected many traditional Philippine textiles.

Binakael patterns may use a two-block rep weave, making them double-sided, but with colour reversal.

In culture
Mara Coson's novel "Aliasing" was inspired by binakael weave.

See also

 Op art
 Inabel
 T'nalak

References

Weaving
Optical illusions